Year 1034 (MXXXIV) was a common year starting on Tuesday (link will display the full calendar) of the Julian calendar.

Events 
 By place 
 Byzantine Empire 
 April 11 – Emperor Romanos III (Argyros) is drowned in his bath, at the urging of his wife Zoë, who marries her chamberlain, and elevates him to the throne of the Byzantine Empire, as Michael IV. Romanos is buried in the Church of St. Mary Peribleptos in Constantinople.

 Europe 
 Spring – Emperor Conrad II (the Elder) leads a German military expedition via the Rhone River into Burgundy, while two Italian armies led by Archbishop Aribert and Boniface III (margrave of Tuscany) head over the Alps and join with Count Humbert I at Great St. Bernard Pass.
 March – Conrad II converges his armies on Lake Lemano and defeats Count Odo II in battle at Geneva (modern Switzerland). For his assistance, Conrad grants Humbert I with the Burgundian county of Maurienne.
 May – King Mieszko II dies after a 6-year reign (probably killed as a result of a conspiracy) and is succeeded by his 17-year-old son Casimir I (the Restorer). A violent revolt spreads throughout Poland.
 King Sancho III (the Great) of Pamplona captures León, after defeating a string of rivals. His rule now extends from the borders of Galicia in the west to the County of Barcelona in the east.
 Summer – Poland is broke up into regions (during the so-called Pagan Reaction). Queen Richeza, Casimir I and his sisters Ryksa and Gertruda are driven into exile in Germany.
 November 25 – King Malcolm II dies in battle at Glamis. He is succeeded by Duncan I, son of his eldest daughter, rather than Macbeth, who is possibly another grandson of his.
 In Al-Andalus, benefiting from the weakening of the Muslim central authority, the count of Portugal, Gonçalo Maia, conquers Montemor-o-Velho (approximate date).
 Franche-Comté becomes subject to the Holy Roman Empire.

 Africa 
 A Pisan and Genovese fleet attack Bona (modern Annaba) on the Maghribi coast (modern Tunisia). The city is occupied for one year.

Births 
 Joscelin I de Courtenay, French nobleman (House of Courtenay) 
 Khön Könchok Gyalpo, founder of Sakya Monastery (d. 1102)

Deaths 
 February 21 – Hawise of Normandy, French duchess and regent 
 March 21 – Ezzo (or Ehrenfried), German count palatine
 April 11 – Romanos III (Argyros), Byzantine emperor (b. 968)
 October 31 – Deokjong, ruler of Goryeo (Korea) (b. 1016)
 November 9 – Oldřich (or Odalric), duke of Bohemia 
 November 19 – Theodoric II, margrave of Lower Lusatia
 November 25 – Malcolm II, king of Alba (Scotland)
 December 8 – Æthelric (or Brihtmær), English bishop
 Adémar de Chabannes, French monk and historian
 Ali ibn Hasan (Ali-Tegin), Karakhanid ruler (khagan)
 Amlaíb mac Sitriuc, Norse-Gaelic king of Dublin
 Bernard Roger, French nobleman (approximate date)
 Manuchihr I, Persian ruler (shah) of Shirvan
 Matilda of Franconia, daughter of Conrad II
 Mieszko II (St. Lambert), king of Poland
 Qian Weiyan, Chinese politician and poet
 Salim ibn Mustafad, Mirdasid rebel leader
 Samuel ben Hofni, Jewish rabbi and writer

References